Shotgun surgery is an antipattern in software development and occurs where a developer adds features to an application codebase which span a multiplicity of implementors or implementations in a single change. This is common practice in many programming scenarios, as a great amount of programming effort is usually expended on adding new features to increase the value of programming assets. As a consequence, these new features may require adding code in several places simultaneously where the code itself looks very similar and may only have slight variations. Owing to the fast-paced nature of commercial software development, there may not be sufficient time to remodel (or refactor) a system to support the new features trivially. As a consequence, the practice of copy-and-paste programming is prevalent; the code is written in a single place then simply copied to all other places where that implementation is required (with any required changes applied in-place).

This practice is generally frowned on by the refactoring community as a direct violation of the Once and Only Once principle – ultimately any change to the new functionality may require widespread changes. Further, any potential software bug in this new feature will be replicated many-fold and can make bug fixing particularly difficult and tedious. Even in the absence of copied code, the implementations are guaranteed to be very similar and just as prone to requirements change or bug fixing. This form of software development tends to favour short-term improvement (in the form of additional features) at the cost of long-term maintainability and stability.

Example
The canonical example of this practice is logging which generally adds prologue code to many functions simultaneously, for example:

void MyFunc() {
  ...
}

void MyFunc2() {
  ...
}

...

void MyFuncN() {
  ...
}

Could be transformed to:

void MyFunc() {
  printf("Entering MyFunc\n");
  ...
}

void MyFunc2() {
  printf("Entering MyFunc2\n");
  ...
}

...

void MyFuncN() {
  printf("Entering MyFuncN\n");
  ...
}

Here a single requirement has added similar code to several functions simultaneously. As such any change in requirements here (namely adding line numbers to the log) would now require a considerable effort.  Shotgun surgery is not synonymous with cut and paste coding, as highlighted by this trivial example.  The practice of copying code can be viewed as a "means to an end", where shotgun surgery is merely an "end" (i.e. there are many ways to reach the same conclusion).

Consequences of shotgun surgery
The concerns with this style are by-and-large the same as those for any duplication in a software system; that is, duplicating the same logic in many places can vastly increase the costs of making changes to the same logic later. Some of the aforementioned costs are measurable, others are not (at least not trivially). There is also some evidence that this antipattern is correlated with higher defect rates.

Typically some combination of the following is to be expected:
 Increased developer effort and reduced throughput
 Associated monetary cost of the above (as in commercial development)
 Psychological effects and potential neglect of code

Of these the most insidious are the psychological effects (e.g. see Broken Windows Theory) which can exponentially lead to software rot. When uncontrolled this can cause entire codebases to become unmaintainable. Generally the only solution to this problem is to completely rewrite the code  (at substantial cost).

Mitigation
Aspect oriented programming (AOP) aims at reducing these forms of invasive modifications in favour of adopting an "aspect" or "concern". The solutions take the form of boilerplate code which can be applied over a domain of functions simultaneously (through the process of weaving) which vastly reduces the amount of duplicated code. The use of Domain Specific Languages is also becoming more widespread where light-weight compilers are written to generate most of the duplicated code on the behalf of the programmer. Both methods fall into the broader categories of code generation and automation.

See also
 Shotgun debugging
 Technical debt
 Viscosity, a measurement of resistance to change for the design of notations.

References

Anti-patterns